{{Infobox officeholder
|honorific-prefix   = 
|name               = Yasmina Baddou
|honorific-suffix   = 
|image              = Yasmina Baddou.jpg
|imagesize          = 220px
|smallimage         = 
|alt                = 
|caption            = 
|order              = 

|office            = MP of Casablanca
|term_start        = 7 November 2002
|term_end          = 
|predecessor       = 
|successor        = 

|office1             = Minister of Health
|term_start1         = 19 September 2007
|term_end1           = 3 January 2012
|monarch1            = Mohammed VI
|primeminister1      = Abbas El Fassi
|predecessor1        = Mohamed Cheikh Biadillah
|successor1         = El Hossein El Ouardi

|office2             = Secretary of State for Family, Solidarity and Social Action
|term_start2         = 7 November 2002
|term_end2         = 19 September 2007
|primeminister2      = Abbas El Fassi
|predecessor2        = Nazha Chekrouni(as Delegate-Minister for Women Conditions, Family and Children Protection)
|successor2        = Nouzha Skalli(as Minister of Social Development, Family and Solidarity)

|party              = Istiqlal party
|birth_date         = 
|birth_place        = Rabat, Morocco
|death_date         = 
|death_place        = 
|restingplace       = 
|restingplacecoordinates = 
|birthname          = 
|citizenship        = 
|nationality        = 
|spouse             = Ali Fassi Fihri
|relations          = 
|children           = SafiaZhorOum Hani
|residence          = 
|alma_mater         = University of Mohammad V
|occupation         = Politician, lawyer
|profession         = 
|cabinet            = 
|committees         = 
|portfolio          = 
|signature          = 
|signature_alt      = 
|website            = 
|footnotes          = 
}}

Yasmina Baddou ( – born 23 October 1962, Rabat) is a Moroccan politician of the Istiqlal party. Between 2007 and 2012, she held the position of Minister of Health in the cabinet of Abbas El Fassi, and she was Secretary of State for Family Affairs in the cabinet Driss Jettou.

Yasmina Baddou studied at the "Mission laïque française" (Lycée Descartes of Rabat) and has a master's degree in law from the Mohammed V University of Rabat, she worked as a lawyer before becoming active in politics.

Family
She is the daughter of Aicha Bennani and Abderrahmane Baddou, a Moroccan diplomat, politician and ex-ambassador and is married to Ali Fassi Fihri, brother of Taieb Fassi Fihri the former Minister of Foreign Affairs of Morocco.

Her maternal aunt Aziza Bennani was Secretary of State for Culture in the cabinet of Abdellatif Filali and is the current representative of Morocco at the UNESCO.

Her cousin Ali Baddou, is co-host of Le Grand Journal'', a daily talk show of French television channel Canal+.

See also
Cabinet of Morocco

References

Living people
Government ministers of Morocco
1962 births
People from Rabat
Moroccan women lawyers
Health ministers of Morocco
Mohammed V University alumni
Istiqlal Party politicians
20th-century Moroccan lawyers